The European Urban Knowledge Network (EUKN) was created in Rotterdam in 2004 as a result of an agreement between European ministers on urban policies. The working concept was based on the experience of URBACT but with greater breadth and scope. EUKN members are national governments and knowledge institutes. EUKN works in close association with the European Commission, EUROCITIES, presidencies of the Council of the European Union and the URBACT Programme.

The EUKN's main objective is to facilitate the interaction and exchange of valid and standardised knowledge across Europe on urban issues, structured according to a taxonomy that covers aspects such as housing policies, urban planning, urban environment, land use, sustainable development, accessibility, mobility, security or urban economy; all divided into three main sections: practices, policies, and research networks.

In 2013, the EUKN has obtained the legal status of European Grouping for Territorial Cooperation (EGTC) allowing the network to engage directly in cross-border cooperation and activities.

References 

www.eukn.eu

External links 
 eukn.eu official webpage

International organizations based in Europe
Organizations established in 2004
Organisations based in The Hague